SMPA may refer to:

the Seoul Metropolitan Police Agency
the Swedish Magazine Publishers Association
Swiss Music Pedagogic Association
 Vincent Fayks Airport ICAO code